Terje Ottar (born 18 March 1945) is a Norwegian politician for the Progress Party.

He served as a deputy representative to the Parliament of Norway from Telemark during the terms 1989–1993 and 1993–1997. In total he met during 81 days of parliamentary session.

References

1945 births
Living people
Progress Party (Norway) politicians
Deputy members of the Storting
Politicians from Telemark
Place of birth missing (living people)